Comilla Jagannath Temple, also known as Sateroratna Mandir or seventeen-jewel temple, is located in Comilla, Bangladesh. It is dedicated to the Hindu God Jagannath. It dates back to the early 18th century and was built by Ratna Manikya II, who was the king of Tripura. The deities of Jagannath, Balabhadra and Subhadra were originally installed in a temple in Tripura from where they were subsequently shifted to this temple.

Jagannath Temple is one of the oldest temples of Comilla district. It is located two km south-east from Comilla town.  The terracotta brickwork of the temple is in the typical Bengal style of temple architecture. The seventeen jewels are the towers that originally crowned the structure but have been damaged: eight on the first floor, eight on the second, and one more in the centre.

References

External links
Photograph of the Temple 
Jagannath Cult: Deities of Jagannath Cult, Devotees of Jagannath, Festivals and Ceremonies of Jagannath Cult

Hindu temples in Chittagong Division
Cumilla
16th-century Hindu temples
Temples dedicated to Jagannath
Archaeological sites in Comilla district